Austin United FC, also known as the Flyers, is an American soccer team in Austin, Texas. The team plays in the National Premier Soccer League (NPSL), as part of the league's South Region Lone Star Conference. The team was founded in 2017 and played its first season in the NPSL in 2020.

History 
Austin United FC was founded in 2018 by Orlando Medrano. The team participated in regional competitions for two years before joining the NPSL in 2020.

Operations 
Austin United FC is run by Orlando Medrano, general manager Aracely Alviso. The club has a senior team and a youth academy.

References

External links 
 

Association football clubs established in 2018
Sports teams in Austin, Texas
National Premier Soccer League teams